Jamie Murray and Martina Hingis were the defending champions, but Hingis retired from professional tennis at the end of 2017. Alexander Peya and Nicole Melichar won the title, defeating Murray and Victoria Azarenka in the final, 7–6(7–1), 6–3.

Seeds

Draw

Finals

Top half

Section 1

Section 2

Bottom half

Section 3

Section 4

References

External links
 Mixed Doubles Draw
2018 Wimbledon Championships – Doubles draws and results at the International Tennis Federation

X=Mixed Doubles
Wimbledon Championship by year – Mixed doubles